Holger Granström (25 December 1917 in Ruokolahti, Finland – 22 July 1941) was a professional ice hockey player who played in the SM-liiga. He played for KIF. He was inducted into the Finnish Hockey Hall of Fame in 1985. He also played for the Finland national football team. He was killed in the Continuation War.

Hockey career
In 1935, he began his career at KIF in the Finnish Championships.

Football career
He played in 12 matches for the Finland national football team from 1938 to 1940, scoring 2 goals, both of them coming in the 1937–47 Nordic Football Championship. He was

International goals

References

External links
 Finnish Hockey Hall of Fame bio

1917 births
1941 deaths
People from Ruokolahti
Finnish ice hockey players
Finnish footballers
Finland international footballers
Association football forwards
Finnish military personnel killed in World War II
Sportspeople from South Karelia